Eugenio Scalfari (6 April 1924 – 14 July 2022) was an Italian journalist. He was editor of the news magazine L'Espresso (1963–1968), a member of parliament in the Chamber of Deputies (1968–1972), and co-founder of the newspaper La Repubblica and its editor from 1976 to 1996.

Early life
Scalfari was born in Civitavecchia, in the province of Rome. Scalfari began secondary studies at the Mamiani High School in Rome. Scalfari's family, of Calabrian origin, later moved to Sanremo where his father was artistic director of the Casino, and he completed his high school studies there, at the G.D. Cassini school, where Italo Calvino was a classmate.

In 1950, Scalfari married Simonetta, daughter of the journalist Giulio De Benedetti; she died in 2006. From the end of the seventies Scalfari was romantically linked to Serena Rossetti, former editorial secretary of L'Espresso and later of La Repubblica, whom he married after the death of his wife Simonetta.

Career
A law graduate with an interest in journalism and politics, Scalfari worked for the influential postwar magazines Il Mondo and L'Europeo. In 1955, he was among the founders of the Radical Party.

In October 1955, jointly with Arrigo Benedetti, he co-founded one of Italy's foremost newsmagazines L'Espresso with capital from the progressive industrialist Adriano Olivetti, manufacturer of Olivetti typewriters. The experienced Benedetti, who had directed the newsmagazine L'Europeo (1945–54), was the first editor-in-chief until 1963, when he handed over to Scalfari.

In January 1976, the Gruppo Editoriale L'Espresso also launched the centre-left daily newspaper La Repubblica in a joint venture with Arnoldo Mondadori Editore. Scalfari became the editor-in-chief and remained so until 1996. Few believed such a venture could succeed in the already crowded Italian newspaper market, but under Scalfari's skilful editorship La Repubblica prospered to the point of rivaling the prestigious Corriere della Sera in both sales and status as a national daily.

He remained active in both La Repubblica and L'Espresso. He also published a number of books including in 1969 l'Autunno della Repubblica ("Autumn of the Republic") and the 1998 novel Il Labirinto ("The Labyrinth").

Reporting

As a journalist, Scalfari was especially active in investigative reporting, uncovering illegal right-wing activities and major government cover-ups. In May 1967 with Lino Jannuzzi he uncovered Piano Solo, the attempted 1964 coup d'état led by General Giovanni Di Lorenzo.

In July 2014, he reported, in an interview, Pope Francis's controversial statement that approximately 2% of the Roman Catholic Church's total number of priests, including bishops and  Cardinals, were pedophiles.

In 2018, Scalfari wrote an article related to his interview with Pope Francis stating that the pontiff made claims that Hell did not exist. Scalfari later admitted that some words attributed to the pontiff "were not shared by Pope Francis" himself. Later in 2019, he wrote a further article related to Pope Francis, claiming that the pope "rejects the godly nature of Jesus Christ". This was denied by the Holy See, which said that "as already stated on other occasions, the words that Dr. Eugenio Scalfari attributes in quotation marks to the Holy Father during talks with him cannot be considered a faithful account of what was actually said but represent a personal and free interpretation of what he heard, as appears completely evident from what is written today regarding the divinity of Jesus Christ."

Politics

Initially, like many Italians of the time, Scalfari was a committed Italian Fascist, and described himself as "Young, happy and fascist".

After the Second World War, Scalfari was close to the Italian Liberal Party (PLI). In 1956, he and several others on the left wing of the PLI, such as Marco Pannella and Ernesto Rossi, broke away in order to form the Radical Party.

In 1968, Scalfari was elected to the Chamber of Deputies (1968–1972) as an independent aligned with the Italian Socialist Party (PSI) and handed over his post as editor to Gianni Corbi.

Political positions
Scalfari described himself as "libertarian", and also "liberal of social mold". He was pro-choice in the 1981 Italian referendums.

Personal
He was an atheist. In 2013, he received a personal and detailed explanation from Pope Francis about atheism and forgiveness.

Scalfari died on 14 July 2022, at the age of 98.

References

1924 births
2022 deaths
People from Civitavecchia
Italian atheists
Italian Liberal Party politicians
20th-century Italian politicians
Radical Party (Italy) politicians
Italian Socialist Party politicians
Members of the Chamber of Deputies (Italy)
Knights Grand Cross of the Order of Merit of the Italian Republic
Recipients of the Legion of Honour
Italian newspaper editors
Italian male journalists
Italian magazine editors
People of Calabrian descent
La Repubblica founders
L'Espresso founders
La Repubblica editors